The following lists events that happened during 2022 in Southern Africa. The countries are those described in the  United Nations geoscheme for Southern Africa.

Incumbents

Botswana 

 President of Botswana: Mokgweetsi Masisi (since 2018)
 Vice-President of Botswana: Slumber Tsogwane (since 2018)

Eswatini 

 Chief of state:  Ngwenyama (King): Mswati III (since 1986)
 Head of government: Prime Minister: Cleopas Dlamini (since 2021)

Lesotho 

 Chief of state: King: Letsie III (since 1996)
 Head of government: Prime Minister: Moeketsi Majoro (since 2020)

Namibia 

 President: Hage Geingob (since March 21, 2015)
 Vice President: Nangolo Mbumba (since February 12, 2018) 
 Prime Minister: Saara Kuugongelwa (since March 21, 2015) 
 Deputy Prime Minister: Netumbo Nandi-Ndaitwah (since March 21, 2015)

South Africa 

 President: Cyril Ramaphosa (since 2018)
 Deputy President: David Mabuza (since 2018)
 Chief Justice: Raymond Zondo (since 2022)
 Speaker of the National Assembly: Nosiviwe Mapisa-Nqakula

Events

Elections 

 9 April – 2022 Gambian parliamentary election
 10 July – 2022 Republic of the Congo parliamentary election
 31 July – 2022 Senegalese parliamentary election
 9 August – 2022 Kenyan general election
 24 August – 2022 Angolan general election
 25 September – 2022 São Toméan legislative election
 7 October – 2022 Lesotho general election
 13 November – 2022 Somaliland presidential election
 17 December – 2022 Tunisian parliamentary election

Major holidays 

 March 11 – Anniversary of the death of King Moshoeshoe I, Public holidays in Lesotho.
 March 22 – Independence Day, Public holidays in Namibia.
 March 23 – Southern African Liberation Day, Public holidays in Angola.
 April 19 – King Mswati III′s Birthday, Public holidays in Eswatini.
 April 27 – Freedom Day (South Africa), Public holidays in South Africa.
 May 4 – Cassinga Day, Namibia.
 May 25 – Africa Day.
 July 17 – King Letsie III′s Birthday, Lesotho.
 July 22 – King Father′s Birthday, Eswatini.
 September 6 – Somhlolo Day (Independence Day), Eswatini.
 October 1 – Botswana Day holiday
 October 4 – Independence Day, Lesotho.
 November 11 – Independence Day, Angola.
 December 10 – Human Rights Day.
 December 16 – Day of Reconciliation, South Africa.

Culture

Sports 

 2022–23 CAF Champions League
 2022–23 CAF Confederation Cup
 2022–23 CAF Confederation Cup qualifying rounds

Deaths 

 17 July – Jessie Duarte, 68, politician and acting secretary-general of the African National Congress.

See also 

2021–22 South-West Indian Ocean cyclone season
2022–23 South-West Indian Ocean cyclone season
Southern African Development Community
2022 in East Africa
2022 in Middle Africa
2022 in North Africa
2022 in South Africa
2022 in West Africa
2020s
2020s in political history
Common Market for Eastern and Southern Africa
Southern African Development Community

References 

Southern Africa
Events in Africa
2022 in African sport